Stanisław Zamecznik (10 March 1909 – 2 May 1971) was a Polish graphic artist, poster artist, scenographer and architect. Zamecznik was a professor of State Higher School of Fine Arts, Poznań (now Academy of Fine Arts).  He was a brother of Wojciech Zamecznik, a graphic artist, interior decorator and photographer.

Biography 
Zamecznik was born in Warsaw.  He was co-author of the innovative composition Węgiel at the exhibition in Wrocław (with Wojciech Zamecznik; 1948). He designed numerous of international exhibitions, Wojciech Fangor painting exhibition in an environmental style in the Jewish Theatre in Warsaw (1958), Henry Moore sculpture exhibitions in Warsaw (1959), exhibitions in the National Museum in Warsaw and permanent exhibitions in the Historical Museum in Warsaw. Zamecznik co-designed enlargement of the Zachęta edifice.

He was awarded 1st prize of the Ministry of Culture and Art. Zamecznik's first and only individual exhibition was held posthumously in 1972 in Warsaw, where he died.

References

General references

External links 
 Gallery of film posters by Stanislaw Zamecznik, retrieved on October 14, 2007.
 The Space Between Us at 0047

1909 births
1971 deaths
Artists from Warsaw
Polish poster artists
Polish graphic designers
20th-century Polish architects